List of rivers in Paraíba (Brazilian State).

The list is arranged by drainage basin from north to south, with respective tributaries indented under each larger stream's name and ordered from downstream to upstream. All rivers in Paraíba drain to the Atlantic Ocean.

By Drainage Basin 

 Piranhas River
 Seridó River
 Sabugi River
 Riacho Barra Nova (Rio Grande do Norte)
 Dos Oitis River
 Acauã River (Rio Grande do Norte)
 Currais Novos River (Rio Grande do Norte)
 Picuí River
 Espinharas River
 Da Farinha River
 Piancó River
 Jenipapo River
 Gravatá River
 Peixe River
 São Francisco River
 Jacu River
 Cunaú River (Rio Grande do Norte)
 Curimataú River
 Pirari River
 Calabouço River
 Salgadinho River
 Sombrio River
 Guandu River
 Salto River
 Guaju River
 Estiva River
 Mamanguape River
 Miriri River
 Paraíba River
 Soé River
 Tapira River
 Jacuípe River
 Ribeira River
 Preto River
 Sanhauá River
 Paroeira River
 Maré River
 Obim River
 Tibiri River
 Salvador River
 Una River
 Gurinhém River
 Gurinhenzinho River
 Paraibinha River
 Ingá River
 Taperoá River
 Floriano River
 São José dos Cordeiros River
 Tapera River
 Carnaúba River
 Sucuru River
 Do Meio River
 Do Umbuzeiro River
 Gramame River
 Jacoca River
 Mumbaba River
 Guaji River
 Garou River
 Mocatu River
 Abiaí River
 Papocas River
 Sal Amargo River
 Aterro River
 Goiana River

Alphabetically 

 Abiaí River
 Aterro River
 Calabouço River
 Carnaúba River
 Curimataú River
 Espinharas River
 Estiva River
 Da Farinha River
 Floriano River
 Do Galé River
 Garou River
 Goiana River
 Gramame River
 Gravatá River
 Guandu River
 Guaji River
 Guaju River
 Gurinhém River
 Gurinhenzinho River
 Ingá River
 Jacoca River
 Jacu River
 Jacuípe River
 Jenipapo River
 Mamanguape River
 Maré River
 Do Meio River
 Miriri River
 Mocatu River
 Mumbaba River
 Obim River
 Dos Oitis River
 Papocas River
 Paraíba River
 Paraibinha River
 Paroeira River
 Peixe River
 Piancó River
 Picuí River
 Piranhas River
 Pirari River
 Preto River
 Ribeira River
 Sabugi River
 Sal Amargo River
 Salgadinho River
 Salto River
 Salvador River
 Sanhauá River
 São Francisco River
 São José dos Cordeiros River
 Seridó River
 Soé River
 Sombrio River
 Sucuru River
 Tapera River
 Taperoá River
 Tapira River
 Tibiri River
 Do Umbuzeiro River
 Una River

References
 Map from Ministry of Transport
  GEOnet Names Server

 
Paraiba
Environment of Paraíba